Ghoria gigantea is a moth of the family Erebidae. The species was first described by Charles Oberthür in 1879. It is found in the Russian Far East (Amur, Primorye, Sakhalin), China (Kunashir, Heilongjiang, Liaonin, Hebei, Shanxi, Shaanxi, Zhejiang), Korea and Japan.

References

Moths described in 1879
Lithosiina
Moths of Asia